The women's 100 metre freestyle event at the 1952 Olympic Games took place between 26 and 28 July at the Swimming Stadium. This swimming event used freestyle swimming, which means that the method of the stroke is not regulated (unlike backstroke, breaststroke, and butterfly events). Nearly all swimmers use the front crawl or a variant of that stroke. Because an Olympic size swimming pool is 50 metres long, this race consisted of two lengths of the pool.

Medalists

Results

Heats
Heat 1

Heat 2

Heat 3

Heat 4

Heat 5

Heat 6

Semifinals

Semifinal 1

Semifinal 2

Final

References

Women's freestyle 100 metre
1952 in women's swimming
Women's events at the 1952 Summer Olympics